The long-billed wren-babbler (Napothera malacoptila) is a species of bird in the family Pellorneidae.

It is found in the Himalayas from north-eastern India to southern China. Its natural habitat is subtropical or tropical moist montane forests.

References

 Collar, N. J. & Robson, C. 2007. Family Timaliidae (Babblers)  pp. 70–291 in; del Hoyo, J., Elliott, A. & Christie, D.A. eds. Handbook of the Birds of the World, Vol. 12. Picathartes to Tits and Chickadees. Lynx Edicions, Barcelona.

Birds of Bhutan
Birds of Northeast India
Birds of Myanmar
long-billed wren-babbler
long-billed wren-babbler
Napothera
Taxonomy articles created by Polbot
Taxobox binomials not recognized by IUCN